Raí dos Reis Ramos (born 6 May 1994), known as Raí Ramos, is a Brazilian professional footballer who plays as a right back for Ituano.

Club career
Born in Japorã, Mato Grosso do Sul, Raí Ramos represented Atlético Mineiro and Bahia as a youth before making his senior debut with Monte Azul in the 2013 Copa Paulista. He later moved to Londrina, initially assigned to the youth setup.

After featuring rarely for Londrina's first team in the 2015 season, Raí Ramos moved to Toledo on loan, and finished second in the 2015 Taça FPF. Back to LEC in January 2016, he again featured sparingly before joining Operário Ferroviário also on loan, and won the Taça FPF with the side.

After spending the 2017 campaign without playing a single minute, Raí Ramos moved abroad for the 2018 season with Georgian Erovnuli Liga 2 side Shukura Kobuleti. He returned to Londrina in January 2019, and started to feature more regularly afterwards.

On 22 October 2020, Raí Ramos left Londrina and signed for Oeste. The following 14 July, he agreed to a deal with Varzim in the Liga Portugal 2.

On 7 July 2022, Raí Ramos returned to his home country after joining Ituano.

Career statistics

Honours
Operário Ferroviário
Taça FPF: 2016

References

1994 births
Living people
Sportspeople from Mato Grosso do Sul
Brazilian footballers
Association football defenders
Campeonato Brasileiro Série B players
Campeonato Brasileiro Série C players
Liga Portugal 2 players
Atlético Monte Azul players
Londrina Esporte Clube players
Toledo Esporte Clube players
Operário Ferroviário Esporte Clube players
FC Shukura Kobuleti players
Oeste Futebol Clube players
Varzim S.C. players
Ituano FC players
Brazilian expatriate footballers
Brazilian expatriate sportspeople in Georgia (country)
Brazilian expatriate sportspeople in Portugal
Expatriate footballers in Georgia (country)
Expatriate footballers in Portugal